Eagle Falls is the uppermost waterfall on the South Fork Skykomish River in Washington.  The falls are located downstream from the town of Baring and drop about 25 feet in a high volume cascade.

Recreation 

A lot of recreational activities happen at and near Eagle Falls, usually in the summer.  Shortly after the falls, the river flows into a huge, deep, green pool.  People often swim here on a hot day.  The fact that cliffs up to 60 feet high rise above the pool and a rope swing is also there only makes the area more popular.

This waterfall is also occasionally run by expert kayakers. It is considered a class 5+ rapid and should only be attempted by extremely experienced paddlers. It has been the site of a fatal attempt.

References 

Waterfalls of Snohomish County, Washington
Waterfalls of Washington (state)
Cascade waterfalls